Sayak) is a Bengali theatre group. The theatre group was created in December 1973. The group is directed by Meghnad Bhattacharya. Till January 2012, they have staged 21 full-length and 7 short-length plays.

Selected plays
Here is a list of selected plays performed by Sayak -

Full-length plays

Andhagali.
Anubikshan.
Avisapta.
Basbhumi.
Beokuf.
Dayabadhdha.
Dildar.
Dournama.
Gyan Briksher Fol.
Lamppost.
Mukti! Mukti!
Pinki Buli.

Short plays

Astitwa.
Benche Thaka.
kalbihanga.
Mara Chand.

Awards
West Bengal Natya Academy - 6 times.
Shiromoni Puroshkar (Asian paints)
Dishari Award.
Ultorath Award.
Anandolok Award.

See also
Group theatre of Kolkata

References

External links
Sayak website

Bengali theatre groups